The Anti-Tank Mine, General Service, Mark IV (or  Mk 4 mine) was a British anti-tank mine used during World War II. Externally the mine has a cylindrical main body  filled with explosive either TNT or Baratol. The mine is covered by a pressure plate, which is attached to the mine body by four pins which sit in vertical slots in clips that fold up from the bottom of the mine. The mine uses the Shear-pin based Contact Mine Fuze No.3 Mk I. The fuze consists simply of a spring-loaded striker pin restrained by a shear pin. Sufficient pressure on the pressure plate presses the plate down on the head of the fuze, breaking the shear wire and releasing the striker, which is driven into the detonator by the striker spring.

Specifications
 Diameter: 8 inches
 Height: 5 inches
 Weight: 8.25 lbs
 Explosive content: TNT or Baratol
 Operating pressure: 350 lbs

References

 NAVORD OP 1665, British Explosive Ordnance, Naval Ordnance Systems Command (Updated 1970)

Anti-tank mines of the United Kingdom
World War II weapons of the United Kingdom